SpaceX CRS-7, also known as SpX-7, was a private American Commercial Resupply Service mission to the International Space Station, contracted to NASA, which launched and failed on June 28, 2015. It disintegrated 139 seconds into the flight after launch from Cape Canaveral, just before the first stage was to separate from the second stage. It was the ninth flight for SpaceX's uncrewed Dragon cargo spacecraft and the seventh SpaceX operational mission contracted to NASA under a Commercial Resupply Services contract. The vehicle launched on a Falcon 9 v1.1 launch vehicle. It was the nineteenth overall flight for the Falcon 9 and the fourteenth flight for the substantially upgraded Falcon 9 v1.1.

Launch history

In January 2015, the launch was tentatively scheduled by NASA for no earlier than June 13, 2015. This was adjusted to June 22, 2015, then moved forward to June 19, 2015, and adjusted again to June 26, 2015. Subsequently, the launch had been rescheduled to June 28, 2015, at 14:21:11 UTC, from Cape Canaveral LC-40. The launch was scheduled to be the third controlled-descent and landing test for the Falcon 9's first stage. It would have attempted to land on a new autonomous drone ship named Of Course I Still Love You – named after a ship in the novel The Player of Games by Iain M. Banks.

Launch failure

Performance was nominal until 139 seconds into launch when a cloud of white vapor appeared, followed by a rapid loss of pressure in the liquid oxygen tank of the Falcon 9's second stage. The booster continued on its trajectory until the vehicle completely broke up several seconds later. The Dragon CRS-7 capsule was ejected from the exploding launch vehicle and continued transmitting data until it impacted with the ocean. SpaceX officials stated that it could have been recovered if the parachutes had deployed, but the software in the capsule did not include any provisions for parachute deployment in this situation. It is assumed that the capsule crumpled and broke up on impact. Subsequent investigation traced the accident to the failure of a strut that secured a high-pressure helium bottle inside the second stage's liquid-oxygen tank. With the helium pressurization system integrity breached, excess helium quickly flooded the liquid-oxygen tank, causing it to overpressurize and burst.

An independent investigation by NASA concluded that the most probable cause of the strut failure was a design error: instead of using a stainless-steel eye bolt made of aerospace-grade material, SpaceX chose an industrial-grade material without adequate screening and testing and overlooked the recommended safety margin.

Payload

Primary payload
NASA contracted for the CRS-7 mission from SpaceX and therefore determined the primary payload, date/time of launch, and orbital parameters for the Dragon space capsule.

, the first International Docking Adapter, IDA-1, was scheduled to be delivered to the International Space Station on CRS-7.
This adapter would have been attached to one of the existing Pressurized Mating Adapters (specifically, PMA-2 or PMA-3) and convert the existing APAS-95 docking interface to the newer NASA Docking System (NDS).
These adapters allow docking of the newer human-transport spacecraft of the Commercial Crew Program.  Previous United States cargo missions since the retirement of the Space Shuttle have been berthed, rather than docked, while docking is considered the safer and preferred method for spacecraft carrying humans. The subsequent Cargo Dragon missions CRS-9 and CRS-18 brought docking adapters IDA-2 and IDA-3, to PMA-2 and PMA-3  respectively. They have been in use since 2020.

Detailed payload manifest

A full listing of the cargo aboard the failed mission included the following items:
 Crew Supplies — 
92 Food Bulk Overwrap Bags, 2 Bonus Food Kits, 2 Fresh Food Kits, including custom astronaut food cooked by British chef Heston Blumenthal for British astronaut Tim Peake
Crew Provisions, Crew Care, Operations data file
 Utilization — 
 Canadian Space Agency: Vascular Echo Exercise Band
 European Space Agency: Circadian Rhythms, KUBIK EBOXes, Interface Plate, EPO Peake, BioLab, Spheroids, EMCS RBLSS, Airway Mon., LiOH Cartridge
 Japan Aerospace Exploration Agency: Atomization, Biological Rhythms, Multi-omics, Cell Mechanosensing 3, Plant Gravity Sensing 3, SAIBO L&M, Space Pup, Stem Cells, MSPR LM, Group Combustion Camera
 US: 2 Polars, 6 DCBs and Ice Bricks, 1 MERLIN, FCF/HRF Resupply, HRP Resupply [Kits, MCT, Microbiome, Twin Studies], IMAX Camera, Meteor, Micro-9, MSG Resupply, NanoRacks Modules & 0.5 NRCSD #7, Universal Battery Charger, Veg-03, Microbial Observatory-1, Microchannel Diffusion Experiment, Wetlab RNA Smartcycler, SCK, Story Time, MELFI TDR Batteries
Computer Resources — 
Projector Screen, Sidekick, OCT Laptop & Power Supply, 32GB MicroSD Cards, Generic USB Cables, Power Modules and Card Readers, Preloaded T61p Hard Drives, CD Storage Container, Network Attached Storage Devices, XF305 Camcorders, RS-422 Adapter Cables
Vehicle Hardware — 
CHECS CMS: HRM Watches, Bench Lock Studs, Glenn Harness for Kelly, Kopra and Peake
CHECS EHS:  Monitoring Assemblies, Filter Assemblies, CSA-CP/CDM Battery Assemblies, SIECE Cartridge Assemblies, Water Kit, Petri Dish Packets
CHECS HMS: IMAKs, Oral Med Packs
C&T: C2V2 Communications Unit (and HTV-5 Unit Data Converter)
ECLSS: 3 Pretreat Tanks, Filter Inserts, 9 KTOs, UPA FCPA, CDRS ASV, IMV Valve, Wring Collector, Water Sampling Kits, OGS ACTEX Filter, ARFTA Brine Filter Assemblies, / Pressure Sensor, NORS  Tank, **3 PBA Assemblies, 2 MF Beds, 2 Urine Receptacles, Toilet Paper Packages,  Sensor, Ammonia Cartridge Bag, PTU XFER Hose
EPS: 2 Avionics Restart Cables
Makita Drill, PWD Filter, N3 Bulkhead Connectors, Yellow/Red Adapters, IWIS Plates, 6.0 & 4.0 Waste Xfer Bags, BEAM Ground Straps, JEM Stowage Wire Kit
 EVA Hardware — 
SEMU, REBA, EMU Ion Filters (4), Equipment Tethers, Gas Grap, EMU Mirrors, Crew Lock Bags, SEMU arms/legs
Lindgren/Yui ECOKs & CCAs, Lindgren LCVG
Kelly LCVG, Padalka EMU Gloves
Russian Cargo
Russian Segment Torque Wrench
Unpressurized Cargo — 
International Docking Adapter #1

The Center for the Advancement of Science in Space had arranged for it to carry more than 30 student research projects to the station including experiments dealing with pollination in microgravity as well as an experiment to evaluate a sunlight blocking form of plastic.

CRS-7 would have brought a pair of modified Microsoft HoloLenses to the International Space Station as part of Project Sidekick.

Planned post-launch flight test

After the second stage separation, SpaceX planned to conduct a flight test and attempt to return the Falcon 9's nearly empty first stage through the atmosphere and land it on autonomous spaceport drone ship Of Course I Still Love You.

This would have been SpaceX's third attempt to land the booster on a floating platform after earlier tests in January 2015 and April 2015 were not successful.  The boosters were fitted with a variety of technologies to facilitate the flight test, including grid fins and landing legs to facilitate the post-mission test.

See also

 2015 in spaceflight
 List of Falcon 9 and Falcon Heavy launches
 Cygnus CRS Orb-3
 Progress M-27M

References

External links
 Mission Overview, NASA, 2 pages, pdf, June 24, 2015.
 Press Kit, NASA, 27 pages, pdf, June 26, 2015.

SpaceX Dragon
Spacecraft launched in 2015
Satellite launch failures
SpaceX payloads contracted by NASA
Supply vehicles for the International Space Station
Rocket launches in 2015
Space accidents and incidents in the United States